Somos Los Carmona is a Chilean telenovela originally broadcast on TVN.

Cast 
 Álvaro Rudolphy as Facundo Carmona
 Carolina Arregui as Rosa Leiva Loyola
 Fernando Larraín as Roberto Velasco
 Ingrid Cruz as Isabel Durán
 Luis Alarcón as Rosendo Carmona
 Gabriela Hernández as Perpetua Loyola
 Magdalena Müller as Carmen "Yoyita" Carmona Leiva
 Francisco Puelles as Alberto "Piduco" Carmona Leiva
 María de los Ángeles García as Francisca Catalán
 Ignacio Susperreguy as Felipe Velasco Durán
 Valentina Carvajal as Rocío Velasco Durán
 Matías Gil as Diego Briceño
 Gabriela Medina as Humilde Loyola
 Víctor Montero as Esteban Poblete
 Andrea Eltit as Alejandra Sanhueza
 Agustina Lavín as Susana Carmona Leiva
 Diego García as Jacinto Carmona Leiva
 Isidora Artigas as Ignacia Velasco Durán
 Francisco Godoy as Camilo Briceño
 Hernán Lacalle as Florencio Gallardo
 Teresa Hales as Rebeca Ortiz
 Viviana Shieh as Yoko Ching Weng Hwa
 Constanza Palavicino as Alfonsina
 Julieta Flores Astorga como Fresia de las Mercedes
 Claudio Andía as Vittorio.

See also
 Televisión Nacional de Chile

References

External links
  Official website

2013 telenovelas
2013 Chilean television series debuts
2014 Chilean television series endings
Chilean telenovelas
Spanish-language telenovelas
Televisión Nacional de Chile telenovelas